Manchester is a North Shore neighborhood in Pittsburgh, Pennsylvania. The neighborhood is represented on Pittsburgh City Council by the District 6 (Northshore/Downtown Neighborhoods). Manchester houses PBF Battalion 1 & 37 Engine, and is covered by PBP Zone 1 and the Bureau of EMS Medic 4. The neighborhood includes the Manchester Historic District, which protects, to some degree, 609 buildings over a  area.  The district was listed on the National Register of Historic Places in 1975. It uses ZIP code of 15233.

History
Manchester began as a village along the shore of the river, providing supplies and services to the surrounding farms. On November 2, 1843, by act of the Pennsylvania Assembly, the borough of Manchester was created out of the surrounding Ross Township. By 1868 there was a well-used wharf in the borough that needed repair. On 12 March 1867, the State Legislature enacted a statute to allow Allegheny City to annex the Borough of Manchester, adding a 9 April 1867 supplement to also annex the southern portions of M'Clure and Reserve townships. Until 1907, Manchester was a ward of Allegheny, Pennsylvania. Thereafter it is a neighborhood of Pittsburgh with boundaries that are still clearly known.

Geography
The Manchester Historic District is Pittsburgh's largest historic district under the National Register of Historic Places, preserved for its early 19th century-built Late Victorian-style houses.

Manchester was rated as one of the top 10 neighborhoods for "being close to everything" because it's walkable and has easy access to public transportation and major roadways. The Three Rivers Heritage Trail System runs along Manchester.

Demographics
Manchester is almost exclusively residential. As of the 2010 census, there were 2,130 people residing in Manchester. According to a report created by the University Center for Social and Urban Research, 46.3% of houses were families while 55.7% were nonfamily households. The median sales price for homes in Manchester for Nov 12 to Jan 13 was $172,350. This represents an increase of 36.8%, or $46,350, compared to the prior quarter and an increase of 48.6% compared to the prior year. Sales prices have appreciated 94.7% over the last 5 years in Manchester, Pittsburgh. The median sales price of $172,350 for Manchester is 29.68% higher than the median sales price for Pittsburgh PA. Average price per square foot for homes in Manchester was $54 in the most recent quarter, which is 43.75% lower than the average price per square foot for homes in Pittsburgh.

Education
Manchester's public schools are managed by Pittsburgh Public Schools.

Surrounding Pittsburgh neighborhoods
Allegheny West
California-Kirkbride
Central Northside
Chateau
Marshall-Shadeland

Gallery

Notable Residents 
Sue Kerr

See also
 List of Pittsburgh neighborhoods

References

External links

Interactive Pittsburgh Neighborhoods Map
Manchester Historic Society
Manchester Citizen's Corporation
Mexican War Streets Society
Carnegie Science Center 
Carnegie Library of Pittsburgh
Manchester Craftmen's Guild
City Council District 6
Manchester Youth Development Center

Historic districts in Pittsburgh
Neighborhoods in Pittsburgh
City of Pittsburgh historic designations
Pittsburgh History & Landmarks Foundation Historic Landmarks
Historic districts on the National Register of Historic Places in Pennsylvania
National Register of Historic Places in Pittsburgh